Czech Republic–Kenya relations are bilateral relations between Czech Republic and Kenya.

History
Kenya and the Czech Republic maintain cordial relations.

The First Deputy Prime Minister and Foreign Minister of the Czech Republic visited Kenya in 2011. In 2006, the Czech Deputy Minister of Industry and Trade visited Kenya. A 14-member parliamentary team visited and attended an inter-parliamentary meeting in Nairobi.

The Kenyan tourism minister visited the Czech Republic in 2006.

Development cooperation
Kenya and the Czech Republic have signed agreements in:
Scientific and Technical Cooperation between the governments of the Czechoslovak Socialist Republic and Kenya in 1964
Cultural Cooperation signed between the governments of the Czechoslovak Socialist Republic and Kenya in 1986
Air Services Agreement signed between the governments of the Czechoslovak Socialist Republic and Kenya in 1989

Both countries have identified key areas in development such as commerce, trade, tourism, education and culture.

Approximately, 10,000 Czech tourists visit Kenya annually. The first ever chartered flight from Prague to Kenya was inaugurated in 2006. 
The Government of the Czech Republic offers two scholarships to Kenyans annually, about 30 Kenyans study in the Czech Republic. Approximately 50 Kenyans live in the Czech Republic. The Czech Republic has also in the past offered assistance in environmental protection and drought mitigation.

Trade
Kenya is one of the most important trade partners for the Czech Republic in Sub-Saharan Africa.

In 2006, bilateral trade was worth KES. 638.2 million (EUR. 6.2 million). The Czech Republic exported goods worth KES. 446.1 million (EUR. 4.35 million) to Kenya.

The balance of trade is still heavily in favour of the Czech Republic as Kenya's exports largely consist of agricultural produce.

Kenya's main exports to the Czech Republic include: coffee, cut flowers, fruit and vegetables.

The Czech Republic's main exports to Kenya include: steel rods, glass beads, aircraft and their spare parts, instruments and carpets, forklifts, pharmaceuticals products, surgical equipments, lathes and agricultural inputs and vehicles.

Diplomatic missions

The Kenyan embassy in the Netherlands is accredited to the Czech Republic. The Czech Republic opened its embassy in Nairobi in November 2014.

See also 
 Foreign relations of the Czech Republic 
 Foreign relations of Kenya

References

External links
Embassy of the Czech Republic in Kenya

 
Kenya
Czech Republic